This article is about public holidays in Panama.

Holidays
Panama's national public holidays are:
 January 1 New Year's Day
 January 9 Martyrs' Day
 Carnival Tuesday before Ash Wednesday
 Good Friday
 May 1 Labour Day
 November 3  Separation Day
 November 4  Flag Day -Observed only by Public Agencies and all schools. Not a holiday for the private sector.
 November 5  Colon Day
 November 10  "Primer Grito de Independencia de la Villa de Los Santos" celebrating The Gesture of Rufina Alfaro and the uprising in the Villa de Los Santos against Spain.
 November 28  Independence Day (from Spain, 1821)
 December 8  Mother's Day
 December 20 National Mourning Day
 December 25  Christmas Day

Variable dates

2020
Carnaval begins (Monday) – February 24
Ash Wednesday – February 26
Good Friday – April 10
2021
Carnaval begins (Monday) begins – February 15
Ash Wednesday – February 17
Good Friday – April 2
2022
Carnaval begins (Monday) – February 28
Ash Wednesday – March 2
Good Friday – April 15
2023
Ash Wednesday – February 22
Good Friday – April 7
2024
Ash Wednesday – February 14
Good Friday – March 29
2025
Good Friday – April 18

Fiestas Patrias (National Holidays)
The holidays in November (starting from Separation Day), are called the Fiestas Patrias ("National Holidays").

References

Society of Panama
Panama
Events in Panama
Holidays
Panama
Panama